Steinfass House (Danish. Steinfass Gård) is a listed house overlooking Christianshavn Canal in the Christianshavn neighbourhood of Copenhagen, Denmark. It is now part of the Sofiegården hall of residence.

History

17th and 18th centuryies

A larger property at the site was listed as No. 102 in Christianshavn Quarter in Copenhagen's first cadastre of 1789. It was at that time owned by judge Iver Caspersen. It was later divided into a number of smaller properties. The property now known as Overgaden Oven Vandet 32 was listed as No. 311 in the new cadastre of 1756. It was at that time owned by Lars Pedersen Tøyberg.

The current house was built for Jacob Steinfass in 1770–71 to a design by an unknown architect.

19th century

The property was listed as No. 186 in the new cadastre of 1806. It was at that time owned by haulier  Jens Olsen.

The painter P. C. Skovgaard lived in the building from   1842 to 1843.
 The building was listed in 1945.

Architecture
Steinfass House is built in the Neoclassical style. It was built as an adaption and extension of an existing building and incorporates elements from its predecessor.

Today
In the early 1970s, he house was converted into a dorm, Sofiegården, and expanded with modern wings along Sofiegade and Dronningensgade. The original contains five rooms and two three-room flats in two upper floors, and various shared facilities on the ground floor, including a day-care centre. The basement houses the bar Sofiekælderen which is popular for live music.

References

External links

Houses in Copenhagen
Listed residential buildings in Copenhagen
Listed buildings and structures in Christianshavn
Houses completed in 1771